Sabbithical Flesh Possession is the second studio album by the French death metal band Vorkreist. It was released on Xtreem Music in 2003.

Track listing

Vorkreist albums
2003 albums